Amblyptilia is a genus of moths in the family Pterophoridae. The genus was raised by the German entomologist, Jacob Hübner in 1825.

Species

Amblyptilia acanthadactyla (Hübner, 1813)
Amblyptilia acanthadactyloides 
Amblyptilia aeolodes 
Amblyptilia atrodactyla 
Amblyptilia bowmani 
Amblyptilia clavata 
Amblyptilia deprivatalis 
Amblyptilia direptalis 
Amblyptilia epotis 
Amblyptilia falcatalis 
Amblyptilia fibigeri 
Amblyptilia forcipata 
Amblyptilia galactostacta 
Amblyptilia grisea 
Amblyptilia hebeata 
Amblyptilia heliastis 
Amblyptilia incerta 
Amblyptilia iriana 
Amblyptilia japonica 
Amblyptilia kosteri 
Amblyptilia landryi 
Amblyptilia lithoxesta 
Amblyptilia pica 
Amblyptilia punctidactyla 
Amblyptilia punoica 
Amblyptilia repletalis 
Amblyptilia scutellaris 
Amblyptilia shirozui 
Amblyptilia skoui 
Amblyptilia viettei 
Amblyptilia zhdankoi

References

 
Platyptiliini
Moth genera
Taxa named by Jacob Hübner